Sinyar are the members of a minor ethnic minority in Chad and possibly Sudan (West Darfur). Most speak Sinyar, a Nilo-Saharan language, as well as Chadian Arabic and Fur. They are Muslims and culturally Fur.

References 

Ethnic groups in Sudan
Ethnic groups in Chad